Abraham S. Bordon (October 7, 1891 – August 7, 1981) was a justice of the Connecticut Supreme Court in 1961, for five months.

Born in the Russian Empire, Borden came to the United States as a child, and received a law degree from the Cornell University Law School in 1914.

His judicial service began with an appointment to the Hartford County Common Pleas Court in 1931. He "served for more than a decade on the Superior Court", until Governor John N. Dempsey appointed him to the Connecticut Supreme Court in 1961. Borden resigned later that year.

References

Justices of the Connecticut Supreme Court
Emigrants from the Russian Empire to the United States
1891 births
1981 deaths
Cornell Law School alumni
American people of Ukrainian descent
20th-century American judges